Törtkül (also known as Vostochniy until 1992) is a village in the Kemin District of Chüy Region of Kyrgyzstan. Its population was 617 in 2021.

References 

Populated places in Chüy Region